Anne Linnet (born 30 July 1953 in Århus, Denmark) is a Danish singer, musician composer، and writer. She has released a number of solo albums and has also been a member of several bands, such as Shit & Chanel, Anne Linnet Band, and Marquis de Sade. Anne Linnet is one of a small group of Danish musicians and songwriters consistently popular now for many years. She is, and has been for more than three and a half decades, a distinctive figure on the Danish music scene and is valued as a writer and composer. Anne Linnet is known for her well-written, honest lyrics, her explorations into a number of music styles, and a constant desire to try something new. In 2008 she received IFPI Denmark's prize of honour for her work of many years on the Danish music scene.

Career
Anne Linnet had her musical debut at the age of 17, in 1970, with the Århus based band "Tears", with whom she released two albums. In 1973 she was one of the founding members of the all-woman band, Shit & Chanel, which released four albums in their seven years together. One of their largest hits was the song, "Smuk og Dejlig", written by Anne Linnet. One of the reasons for the band's split was that the House of Chanel had won a lawsuit against them, regarding the use of the name "Chanel".  After that, the band members felt a need to move on and do something new.

Following the split, Anne Linnet formed the band, Anne Linnet Band, which released two albums in 1981 and 1982 respectively. Two other singers and musicians in the band were Sanne Salomonsen and Lis Sørensen, both popular singers/musicians who have since had long and successful careers.

In 1983, she formed a new band, . The sound was harder and more electronic, inspired by other European, mid-eighties bands, such as Eurythmics, and was a change from the softer pop/folk sound that had characterised her music until then. The band released two albums. At the time they created some controversy, and became known for some of their songs having sadomasochistic ("Marquis de Sade") and lesbian ("Hils din mor", "Venus") themes. They had large hits with songs such as "Glor på Vinduer" and "Nattog".

In 1986, Anne Linnet wrote music for the film, Barndommens Gade based on the novel of the same name by the Danish poet Tove Ditlevsen. She set a number of Tove Ditlevsen's poems to music, which was released on the album Barndommens Gade. The poem/song, "Barndommens Gade", became a hit.

In 1988, she released the album Jeg Er Jo Lige Her (Danish for I am right here). The first single was the evergreen "Tusind Stykker" (Danish for Thousand Pieces), which became a large hit, first in Anne Linnet's version, and later also in a Swedish version, performed by the Swedish singer and musician, Björn Afzelius.

In 1989, she released the album Min Sang in collaboration with the Danish priest, author and lecturer, Johannes Møllehave. The album contains her poems inspired by her Christian faith. Linnet and Møllehave have later collaborated on a series of church concerts and lectures.

In 1996, she wrote a chamber opera, Thorvaldsen, about the Danish, 19th-century sculptor Bertel Thorvaldsen.

Anne Linnet has also authored several books. In 1983, she published a collection of poems; Glimt, in 1999, the first part of her autobiography; Hvor kommer drømmene fra?, and in 2000, four short children's books about Ivan the dog.

In 2006, she had a showing of her oil paintings in Rundetårn, Copenhagen.

In 2007, she released the critically acclaimed solo album Akvarium which became a success.

On 20 August 2012 it was announced that Linnet would replace Cutfather as a judge on X Factor for its sixth season, joining Thomas Blachman and fellow new judge Ida Corr (who replaced Pernille Rosendahl). She mentored the Groups category and came in third place with Wasteland. For unknown reasons, Linnet did not return as a judge for the seventh season and was replaced by original judge Remee.

Personal life
Anne Linnet passed her Studentereksamen (A levels equivalent) at Århus Statsgymnasium and went on to obtain a degree from the Royal Academy of Music, Århus.
Until 1985, she was married to the jazz musician, Holger Laumann, with whom she has two children; Eva (Evamaria) and Jan Martin (Sean), now named Marcus.
She is also the mother of Alexander Theo Linnet, whom she had with Mads Buhl Nielsen. Alexander followed a musical life like his mother and is known as Xander and his single "Det burde ikk være sådan her" topped the Danish Singles Charts in 2011.
Linnet also has two adopted Rumanian-born children, Peter and Maria.
She is a Bisexual and has had both male and female lovers, and has, over time, become a Lesbian icon in Denmark.

On 6 June 2010, BT reported that Anne Linnet had signed a partnership and awaited children with 23-year-old Tessa Franck. On 31 July 2010, Tessa Franck Linnet gave birth to a daughter named Isolde Elisabeth Franck Linnet. On 19 April 2013, Tessa gave birth to a boy named Nemo. In December 2013, Anne Linnet announced that the couple had separated.

Discography (incomplete)
as Tears
 Tears (Spectator, 1970)
 In My Ears (Artist, 1974)

as Shit & Chanel
 Shit & Chanel (1975)
 Shit & Chanel No. 5 (1976)
 Tak for sidst (1978)
 Dagen har så mange farver (1979)

as Anne Linnet Band
 Anne Linnet Band (CBS, 1981)
 Cha Cha Cha (CBS, 1982)

as Anne Linnet & Marquis De Sade
 Marquis De Sade (CBS, 1983)
 Hvid Magi (CBS, 1985)
 En Elsker (CBS, 1986)
 Over mig, under mig (Universal, 2002)

as Anne Linnet
 Sweet Thing (1973) LP
 Anne Linnet (1974) LP
 Kvindesind (Exlibris, 1977)
 You're Crazy (Better Day Records, 1979)
 Berlin '84 (CBS, 1984), Linnet / Salomonsen
 Barndommens Gade (CBS, 1986)
 Jeg Er Jo Lige Her (Pladecompagniet, 1988)
 Go' Søndag Morgen (Pladecompagniet, 1989), children's album
 Min Sang (Pladecompagniet, 1989)
 Krig & Kærlighed (Pladecompagniet/Virgin, 1990), Linnet / Salomonsen
 Det' Så Dansk (Pladecompagniet, 1992)
 Tal til mig (Pladecompagniet, 1993)
 Pige Træd Varsomt (Pladecompagniet, 1995)
 Thorvaldsen (Pladecompagniet, 1996) Opera
 Bitch Boys (Mega Records, 1997) Bitch Boys
 Nattog Til Venus (Sony Music, 1999) double CD compilation
 Jeg og Du (Grappa, 2000)
 Relax (Universal Music, 2003)
 Her hos mig (Universal Music A/S, 2005)
 Akvarium (Sony BMG, 2007)
 Anne Linnet (Sony BMG, 2008)
 Boksen (Sony BMG, 2009)
 Linnets Jul (Sony, 2010)
 De bedste (Sony, 2011)
 Kalder længsel (Sony, 2012)
 Alle Mine Drømme om Dig (ArtPeople, 2015)
 Vi Synger Julen Ind'' (Sony, 2020)

Notes

External links
 Linnetsongs, official website
 

1953 births
20th-century Danish women singers
Living people
Bisexual composers
Danish LGBT singers
Bisexual singers
Bisexual women
Danish bisexual people
People from Aarhus
21st-century Danish women singers
Danish women composers
20th-century Danish composers
21st-century Danish composers
20th-century women composers
21st-century women composers
20th-century Danish LGBT people
21st-century Danish LGBT people